Abra may refer to:

Places 
 Abra, Burkina Faso
 Abra, Ivory Coast
 Abra (province), a province of the Philippines
 Abra's at-large congressional district
 Legislative district of Abra
 Abra de Ilog, a municipality of Occidental Mindoro in the Philippines
 Abra River, in the Philippines
 El Abra, an archaeological site in Colombia
 Abra, Lebanon, a municipality of Lebanon
 Abra, Pakistan
 Abra Channel, connecting the Magellan Strait with the Pacific Ocean

People 
 Abra (name), a given name and a surname
 Abra (Samma tribe) or Abro, an ethnic group in Pakistan
 Abra (rapper) (born 1990), stage name of Filipino rapper Raymond Abracosa
 Abra (singer) (born 1989), stage name of Atlanta-based R&B musician Gabrielle Mirville

Other uses 
 Check Point Abra, a USB drive that combines an encrypted USB flash drive with virtualization, VPN and computer security technologies
 Abra (boat), a type of river-crossing boat in Dubai, United Arab Emirates
 Abra (company), an American financial services and technology company operating in the United States and the Philippines
 ABRA (gene), a human gene located on chromosome 8
 Abra (Pokémon), a Pokémon species
 American Boat Racing Association
 Abra (bivalve), a genus of Semelidae clams
 Abra, a novel by Joan Barfoot
 Abra (motorcycle), an Italian motorcycle that was manufactured from 1923 to 1927

See also 
 Abracadabra, an incantation
 Goodliffe's Abracadabra (known by magicians as "Abra"), a weekly magic magazine that closed in 2009